Royal warrants of appointment in Sweden are granted to the purveyor by the monarch or other member of the royal family. To qualify for a warrant, the order must come from the Royal Court and the company must deliver its goods or services to the court. A royal warrant is personal and usually awarded to the managing director of the company rather than the company itself. All goods and services are paid for by the court.

Current royal warrant holders 
There are c. 130 purveyors:

 Abba Seafood
 Abu Garcia
 Almanacksförlaget
 Almgrens Sidenväveri
 Amanda Christensen
 Annas Pepparkakor
 Aqua Sport i Stockholm
 Arla Foods
 Arne Heine
 Arvid Nordquist
 Askwalls Gravyr
 Atelier Borgila
 Barnängen (Henkel Norden)
 Björn Axén
 Björnekulla Fruktindustrier
 Björnhammarens Naturprodukter
 Bogesunds Väveri
 Bolin, W.A.
 Borås Wäfveri
 BRIO
 Brämhults Juice
 Bukowski Auktioner
 Bölebyns Garveri
 Calligraphen
 Cecil Grafström
 Cloetta
 Delicato
 Designor
 Dr PersFood
 Duro Sweden
 E-foto i Borgholm
 Ejes Chokladfabrik
 EKA-knivar
 Ekelund
 Ekströms (Procordia Food)
 Elektriska AB Lennström
 EngmoDun
 Engströms Livs
 Express-Tryck
 Fenix Outdoor (Fjällräven etc.)
 Fotograf Ingvar Arnmarker
 Freys
 Friends of Handicraft
 Frödinge Mejeri
 Fällkniven
 Fällmans Kött
 Fjällräven
 Gaudy Stockholm
 Gense
 Gevalia (Mondelēz International)
 Grand Hôtel Stockholm
 Guldfynd
 Gustavsbergs Porslinsfabrik
 Gysinge Centrum för Byggnadsvård
 Göteborgs Kex
 Hedéns Grafiska Konsult
 HL Hemtextil
 Hogia
 Hovboktryckare Arne Heine
 Hultberg Eftr. Ram & Förgyllning
 Husqvarna Group / Klippo
 HV Ateljé
 Hästens
 Iittala / Rörstrand
 IKEA
 Insjöns Väveri
 Interiör Inredningstextil
 Isaksson Porfyr
 J F Nordlöf
 Jyden
 K.A. Almgren Sidenväveri
 Kittys Hattar
 Klippo
 Klässbols linneväveri
 Konditori Bankett
 Kosta Boda
 Kvänum kök
 Lars Kjellander Ordensateljé
 Leif Ljungquist
 Liljeholmens Stearinfabrik
 Lindvalls Kaffe
 Lisa Elmqvist Fiskaffär
 Loka (Spendrups)
 Ludvig Svensson
 Lundhags Skomakarna
 Lundqvist Inredningar
 Lysekils, Bakkavör Sweden
 Läkerol (Cloetta)
 Löfbergs
 Manfred Ädelsmed
 Marabou (chocolate)
 Martin Olsson
 Mats Jonasson Målerås
 Melanders Blommor
 Militär Ekiperings Aktiebolaget
 Mille Notti
 Mustadfors Bruk
 Målerås glasbruk
 Märta Måås-Fjetterström
 Nordiska Flaggfabriken
 Norma Precision
 Nära Kroppen /Palmgrens
 Observer Sverige
 Operakällaren
 Orrefors
 Oscar Jacobson
 Oscar Wigén
 Önos (Procordia Food)
 Pahne Textil
 Paradisverkstaden Design
 Polaris Optic
 Poseidon Industri
 Pågen
 Ramlösa Hälsobrunn (Carlsberg Sverige)
 Rikstelegram RT
 Rob. Engström
 Rosas Handel
 Saab Automobile
 Sabis
 Sandberg Tyg och Tapet
 Sandegaards Hantverk
 Scand Office
 Seger Europe
 Scandinavian Eyewear
 Skeppshultcykeln
 Bageri Skogaholm
 Skomakeri Framåt
 Skrufs Glasbruk
 Skultuna Messingsbruk
 Skånska stearinljusfabriken
 Smedbo
 Solenbergs Bokbinderi
 Sporrong
 Steens Herrmode
 Stenströms Skjortfabrik
 Sterling Finemballage
 Stockholms Militärekiperings
 
 Studio Glashyttan i Åhus
 Stutterheim Raincoats
 Svenskt Tenn
 Tarkett Sommer
 TeGe-Produkter
 Tretorn Sweden
 Tryckeri AB Björkmans Eftr.
 Tvätt i Stockholm
 Wasabröd
 Wasasten
 Werner Vögeli
 Vademecum (Hardford)
 Victoria Scandinavian Soap
 Västerbottensost (Norrmejerier)
 Mauritz Widforss
 Vi Engströms Livs
 VO Vapen
 Zia Design
 Z-Metallform
 Örnäs Produkter

References

Bibliography

External links 
Royal Warrant Holders in Sweden 

 
Royal Warrant Holders of the Swedish court
Royal Warrant Holders of the Swedish court